Greger Lewenhaupt (16 December 1920 – 3 August 2008) was a Swedish equestrian. He competed in two events at the 1948 Summer Olympics.

References

1920 births
2008 deaths
Swedish male equestrians
Olympic equestrians of Sweden
Equestrians at the 1948 Summer Olympics
Sportspeople from Stockholm